Attarintiki Daredi is a 2013 Indian Telugu-language action comedy film written and directed by Trivikram Srinivas. Produced by Sri Venkateswara Cine Chitra and Reliance Entertainment, the film stars Pawan Kalyan, Samantha and Pranitha Subhash. Nadhiya, Boman Irani and Brahmanandam feature in supporting roles. The film score and soundtrack album were composed by Devi Sri Prasad. Prasad Murella was the cinematographer.

The film focuses on Gautham Nanda, a business heir who acts as a driver in his estranged aunt Sunanda's house to mend her strained relationship with his grandfather Raghunandan who expelled her for marrying against his wishes years before. Principal photography began in January 2013 and ended in July 2013, with the film being primarily shot in and around Hyderabad. Significant portions were shot in Pollachi and Europe.

The film was released on 27 September 2013 and received positive critical reception. It became the highest grossing Telugu film of all time surpassing Magadheera (2009) and it was later surpassed by Baahubali: The Beginning (2015). The film won four Nandi Awards, four Filmfare Awards South, and the B. Nagi Reddy Memorial Award. It was remade into Kannada as Ranna (2015), in Bengali as Abhimaan (2016), and in Tamil as Vantha Rajavathaan Varuven (2019).

Plot 
Raghunandan is a rich but unhappy businessman based in Milan. He wishes to reconcile with his estranged daughter Sunanda, whom he expelled because she married Rajasekhar against his wishes. His grandson Gautham Nanda promises Raghunandan that he will bring her back to their home on his 80th birthday. Sunanda has three daughters; two of them are Prameela and Sashi. Gautham enters the house as Siddhartha aka Siddhu, a driver who was appointed by Rajasekhar after saving him from a heart attack. Gautham tries to woo Prameela, but gives up when he learns that she is in love with another man. Sashi hates Gautham and is suspicious of him and Paddu, his friend and a nurse who is appointed to take care of Rajasekhar.

Sunanda later reveals to Gautham that she is aware of his real identity much before the incidents, and warns him to abstain from doing anything with the intention of taking her back to Raghunandan.

To save Prameela's love, Gautham and Paddu go to a village, and accidentally Sashi falls into the jeep from the balcony and attains a head injury, thus suffering from amnesia. Gautham introduces himself as her lover for the time being. Sashi believes it. The trio goes to the venue; Gautham and Paddu enter the house. They and the bridegroom escape from there and reach Sunanda's home after a violent altercation with the family members of the bridegroom where Sashi's memory is revived. The bride's father Siddhappa asks for compensation for the damage caused by Siddhu, to which Sunanda promises Sashi's marriage with Siddhappa's elder son. To avoid complications, Rajasekhar fires Gautham. Gautham later learns that Sashi loved him from the beginning but was hesitant to express her feelings. He traps Baddham Bhaskar, a rich NRI staying in Uganda who has a penchant for women, and enters Sunanda's home as his assistant.

Bhaskar falls for Sashi but his attempts are repeatedly thwarted by Gautham. On the day of her marriage, Sashi elopes with Gautham. While waiting with him for the train to Chennai, Siddhappa's men reach the station to stop them only to be trashed by Gautham and his assistants, led by Balu. Through Balu, Sashi discovers Gautham's real motive. An angry Rajasekhar, with Sunanda, arrive to shoot Gautham but Rajasekhar is taken aback after knowing his true identity. Gautham reveals that the day Sunanda left the house, Raghunandan tried to kill himself but accidentally killed Gautham's mother. He says that he chose to love his grandfather though he killed his mother. Sunanda chose to hate him as he injured Rajasekhar and expelled them.

Sunanda and Rajasekhar realise their folly and reconcile with Gautham. Sashi is kidnapped by four henchmen appointed by Bhaskar where she narrates the story to the henchmen. Gautham and Paddu reach the spot and Sashi reconciles with Gautham. Bhaskar's wealth is seized by the government of Uganda and he is left with the same amount with which he ran away from Rajasekhar's house when he assisted him in the past. Raghunandan reconciles with Sunanda, and Gautham is unanimously appointed as the CEO of the company with Raghunandan and Sunanda's support. The film ends with the entire family dining together and Gautham holding Raghunandan's hand with affection.

Cast

Production

Development 
Trivikram Srinivas planned to direct Pawan Kalyan in a film produced by D. V. V. Danayya and narrated the script in late January 2011. However, Srinivas later began Julayi (2012) while Kalyan was working on Gabbar Singh (2012) and Cameraman Gangatho Rambabu (2012). The technical crew of Kalyan's and Srinivas's previous collaboration, Jalsa (2008), were selected to work on the film. B. V. S. N. Prasad was expected to produce Attarintiki Daredi while Kalyan was expected to allot dates in his schedule from October 2012. Srinivas gave finishing touches to the script in late September 2012 and Reliance Entertainment was confirmed to co-produce. Devi Sri Prasad was selected as the music director and the music sittings were held at Barcelona during the location scout in December 2012.

Attarintiki Daredi was launched on 23 November 2012 at Venkateswara temple in Film Nagar.  He  hinted that the script will depict the Telugu culture and traditions with a strong message. Prasad Murella handled the cinematography and few sequences were shot using a Milo robotic camera which B. V. S. N. Prasad brought in from Mumbai as it was unavailable in Hyderabad. In mid July 2013, the title was confirmed to be Attarintiki Daredi.

Casting 
Kalyan opted for a complete makeover and sported a look resembling the one he sported in his previous films Kushi (2001) and Jalsa. After Srinivas narrated the script to Kalyan, he asked him who would play the role of his aunt and Srinivas replied it would be Nadhiya. Kalyan gave his approval for Srinivas's selection and Nadhiya was selected before she signed her comeback film in Telugu, Mirchi (2013). Srinivas narrated the script in a conversation with her over the telephone. After she accepted, he said that he would ask her dates after their schedules were planned. She later revealed that she was scared of being typecast but did the role only on Srinivas' insistence and added that the character's emotions were set quite well.

Srinivas decided to cast Ileana D'Cruz as the female lead who worked with him on Jalsa and Julai. Samantha was confirmed as the female lead in late October 2012 which marked her first collaboration with Kalyan. The second female lead was yet to be selected. By the end of December 2012, most of the films which were in the pre-production phase were confirming their female leads. Because of this the production unit decided to begin the shoot without confirming the other heroine.

Pranitha Subhash was selected as the second female lead in early January 2013 and was confirmed to play Samantha's sister. Pranitha called it a lifetime opportunity and said that she would be seen in a "very sweet, girl-next-door character." Boman Irani made his debut in Telugu with Attarintiki Daredi; he played Raghunandan, the grandfather of Kalyan's character. Kota Srinivasa Rao played the role of Sidhappa Naidu for which he sported a realistic and rugged look. Navika Kotia was selected for the role of the younger sister of Samantha and Pranitha in April 2013.

Srinivas did not cast his regular associate Sunil in the film. Since Sunil's success of Maryada Ramanna (2010) and Poola Rangadu (2012) as a lead actor, Srinivas felt that it would not be fair to make him play a comedian. Rao Ramesh, Mukesh Rishi, Brahmanandam, Ali, M. S. Narayana and Posani Krishna Murali were cast in supporting roles.

Mumtaj and Hamsa Nandini were confirmed to make special appearances in the song "Its Time To Party" marking the former's comeback in Telugu cinema after 12 years after anchor Anasuya refused the offer.

Filming 

B. V. S. N. Prasad stated during the film's launch that principal photography would begin in mid-December 2012. Kalyan searched for new locations in Spain as the story demanded a foreign location and around 30 to 45 days of shooting schedule was planned there. It was the first time Kalyan went for a location hunt and returned in the last week of December 2012. Due to unknown reasons, the film's shoot was postponed to 8 January 2013 in late December 2012.

Shooting finally commenced from 24 January 2013 at a private hotel in Hyderabad. The team planned a new schedule from 4 February 2013 in Pollachi where scenes on Kalyan, Samantha and other support cast were planned to be shot. The schedule was postponed to 15 February 2013 and Srinivas continued the shoot in Hyderabad. After shooting for a few days in Hyderabad at a private mall, the planned schedule at Pollachi began from 12 February 2013.

An action sequence featuring Kalyan and other cast members was shot in late February 2013. The next schedule commenced from 1 March 2013 at a specially erected set at Ramoji Film City in Hyderabad where scenes featuring Kalyan and the other cast members were shot. A few crucial scenes featuring the lead actors were shot there in early April 2013. Art director Ravindar supervised for the special set, which was worth 3 crore. By mid-April 2013, a major portion of the film was shot there. Kalyan and the film's unit planned to leave for Spain to shoot important sequences.

Scenes featuring the lead cast were shot in the end of April 2013 in a railway station set erected at Ramoji Film City. A new schedule began at Ramoji Film City from 2 May 2013. That schedule ended on 28 May 2013. Samantha informed the media that the film's speaking portions had been completed and that an overseas schedule was remaining.

Filming then moved to Europe on 5 June 2013 for a long schedule in which three songs, a few speaking portions and an action sequence were planned to be shot. Kalyan's introduction scene was shot in Switzerland which cost around 2 crore. The introduction scene, which was also an action sequence, was shot on an island located in Spain using helicopters under the supervision of Peter Hein. Post-production activities were done simultaneously and dubbing for the film's first half was completed. The team returned from Milan on 2 July 2013.

The song "Its Time to Party", which primarily features Kalyan, Samantha, Pranitha, Mumtaj and Hamsa Nandini was choreographed by Ganesh and was shot in a pub set erected by Anand Sai at Annapurna 7 Acres Studios. Principal photography wrapped on 14 July 2013.

Themes and influences 
Attarintiki Daredi focuses on a young man's journey trying to convince his estranged paternal aunt to reconcile with the family. In its review, Sify felt that the film's story was a reversal of Nuvvu Naaku Nachav (2001) and Parugu (2008). Kalyan's character, Gautham, is shown watching a few films, where the protagonist is in disguise trying to win over people who matter to him. In the film, Brahmanandam's character spoofs the Ridley Scott film, Gladiator (2000) named Radiator and wins the Bascar awards found by himself after being inspired from the Academy Awards.

The mythological tale of Indra seducing Ahalya after disguising as her husband Gautama and the curse cast by Gautama on them is parodied in the film with Brahmanandam playing a key role. Two songs were parodied: one of them being a devotional song "Kaatama Rayuda" written by the poet Etla Ramadasa and composed by V. Nagayya for the film Sumangali (1940), and the other an item number "Kevvu Keka" written by Sahithi and composed by Devi Sri Prasad for the film Gabbar Singh (2012). A scene from the film, popularly known as the "badam tree" episode, was based on a similar scene from the 2012 English film A Thousand Words.

Music 

Devi Sri Prasad composed the soundtrack album which consists of 6 songs. Sri Mani, Ramajogayya Sastry and Prasad himself wrote the lyrics for the soundtrack album, which was marketed by Aditya Music. The album was released on 19 July 2013 in a promotional event at the Shilpakala Vedika with the film's cast and crew attending the event. The soundtrack album received positive reviews from critics.

Release 
In late April 2013, Attarintiki Daredi was expected to release on 7 August 2013. It was then scheduled for a release on 9 August 2013, the Friday before India's Independence Day. But due to then-ongoing Telangana movement, the release was put on hold. Later B. V. S. N. Prasad officially announced that the film would release on 9 October 2013 along with Ramayya Vasthavayya (2013). But the makers were forced to reschedule the release date to 27 September 2013 after 90 minutes of the footage was leaked onto the internet. On an average, 80% of the film's tickets were sold out in all screens for the first three days in Hyderabad. Apart from India, the film released in United States, United Kingdom, Germany, Canada and Dubai.

Distribution 
The theatrical rights in the Nizam region were acquired by Global Cinemas in late April 2013 for a then undisclosed record price, which was revealed later as 12 crore in early June 2013. My3 Movies announced on 26 April 2013 that they acquired the overseas distribution and DVD rights of the film. Y. Naveen, who financed several overseas distribution firms, acquired this film's overseas rights on behalf of My3 Movies for 7 crore which, according to Sify, was "a big gamble". Colours Media acquired the distribution rights in the United Kingdom from My3 Movies in late July 2013. Lorgan Entertainments acquired the theatrical distribution rights in Australia in early August 2013.

Marketing 

Sai Gopal, who assisted Trivikram since Swayamvaram (1999), was in-charge of the film's promotional activities. The first look poster featuring Kalyan in a red shirt and dark cargo pants was unveiled on 13 July 2013. The first look teaser of 23 seconds was released a day later. Within a day of its release, the video posted by Idlebrain on YouTube fetched more than 190,000 hits and around 6,200 likes. As of 16 July 2013, the teaser fetched over 300,000 hits and about 9,000 likes thus setting a record for any Telugu video uploaded on YouTube at that time. By the end of the next day, the teaser was viewed 706,927 times and received more than 6,000 comments.

The theatrical trailer was released on 19 July 2013 to positive reviews. IANS wrote in its trailer review, "High on commercial value, the slick trailer of Attarintiki Daaredhi is a mix of action, comedy, romance and drama in appropriate proportions. Trivikram hasn't compromised on anything, including special punch lines for Pawan Kalyan, which he mouths in his signature style with a hint of sarcasm." Oneindia Entertainment wrote "Attarintiki Daredi appears to be an out-and-out entertainer with an apt tag-line 'celebration of entertainment'. It is also going to be high in entertainment quotient as some noted comedians Bramhanandam, Srinivas Reddy, Ali tickle the funny bones of the audiences".

The video featuring Kalyan recording the song "Kaatama Rayuda" was released on 4 August 2013. The video received positive response and according to a report by The Times of India, Kalyan's fans were of the opinion that the song composed by Devi Sri Prasad reminded them of the song sung by Kalyan in the film Thammudu (1999). In late October 2013, the makers planned to add two more scenes as a promotional stunt to discourage copyright infringement. Six minutes of footage were added to the film this version was screened from 31 October 2013.

Copyright infringement 
On the night of 22 September 2013, a 90-minute piece of footage was leaked online and was widely shared. B. V. S. N. Prasad filed a complaint the following day against the copyright violation, and sought cyber-protection for Attarintiki Daredi. Because of this incident, the film's release was delayed to 27 September 2013. The film's female lead, Samantha, as well as other celebrities such as Siddharth, Harish Shankar, S. S. Rajamouli, Ram Gopal Varma and Nithiin, condemned the unauthorised distribution act. However, police initially suspected that the incident might be a publicity stunt enacted by people who invested in the film.

On being informed about the alleged sale of the movie in different electronic formats in the CD and mobile shops in Pedana town, Superintendent of Police J. Prabhakara Rao deployed a special team, led by Pedana Rural Circle Inspector A. Pallapu Raju, to investigate the issue. The police launched a hunt for unlicensed compact discs in the CD shops across the district. CDs and hard disks from video parlours and shops renting CDs in the Krishna district were seized, and some of the shop owners were taken into custody for questioning. Kalyan's fans went out into the streets, with signs containing slogans protesting the piracy. Subsequent to their investigation, the police arrested five people, in addition to production assistant Cheekati Arunkumar, and recovered several illegitimate copies of the film on 20 September 2013. Arunkumar had worked as a production assistant for the films Oosaravelli (2011) and Ongole Gittha (2013), both of which were produced by B. V. S. N. Prasad.

Prabhakara Rao told the media that Arunkumar had given a copy of the DVD to his friend and Hyderabad-based APSP constable, Katta Ravi, who sent it to his friend, V. Sudheer Kumar, on 14 September 2013. Pedana-based videographer Poranki Suresh got the DVD from Sudheer Kumar, and later gave it to Kollipalli Anil Kumar, who owns the Devi Mobiles and Cell repair shop in Pedana. Anil Kumar had uploaded the two-part movie into his system, and sold the 60-minute part-one of the movie to his customers in different formats. Anil Kumar deleted the original file in his system after learning about the police raids. However, he confessed to the crime during the investigation. Based on the information given by Anil Kumar, a special team led by Machilipatnam DSP K.V. Srinivasa Rao, with the support of the Crime Investigation Department, Hyderabad, arrested the suspects in Hyderabad. The police filed charges on 24 September 2013, against the five suspects under clauses 63, 65 and 66 of the Copyright (Amendment Bill) 2010 and 429 IPC.

Kalyan and Srinivas decided to return a significant portion of their remuneration to help Prasad overcome the financial crisis caused by the leak. Samantha returned her entire salary to the producers. Kalyan remained silent during the entire issue, but finally spoke at length about the episode at the "Thank You Meet" of the film on 14 October 2013. He said that this was a conspiracy and not piracy. He added that he was very well aware of the facts as to who was behind the leak of the film and will not spare anyone and will strike when the time is right.

Home media 
The Television broadcast rights were sold to an unknown channel in mid June 2013 for an amount of 9 crore which happened to be the highest amount that a television channel paid for the telecast rights of a Telugu film till the sale of rights of Aagadu (2014) to Gemini TV in June 2014. The film's television premier was announced in mid December 2013 to be held on 11 January 2014 in MAA TV. The film registered a TRP rating of 19.04 which was the highest for any Telugu film till date. The Indian DVD and Blu-ray were marketed by Volga Videos. The overseas DVD and Blu-ray were marketed by Bhavani Videos.

Reception

Critical reception 

Attarinitki Daredi received positive reviews from critics according to International Business Times India who called the film a "perfect family entertainer" in their review roundup. Sangeetha Devi Dundoo of The Hindu praised the film's climax scene, while also stating that Trivikram Srinivas makes his presence felt before concluding that the film is, "A good dose of fun, tailored for the box office." Ch. Sushil Rao of The Times of India rated the film 4 out of 5 and wrote "The movie is a worth watch. The reasons: Pawan Kalyan's comedy, fights composed by Peter Hein, Trivikram Srinivas' writing skills, Prasad Murella's cinematography, and Devi Sri Prasad's music. That there is promise in the movie is a feeling one gets right from the opening scenes which are dramatic". Sify rated the film 4 out of 5 and stated "If you are looking for sheer entertainment, know that Pawan Kalyan and Trivikram have gift packed for you with high dose of comedy. It is entertainment, entertainment and entertainment. Pawan Kalyan`s histrionics, his performances and Trivikram`s handling of the simple story in an effective way is what makes Attharintiki Daaredhi a big entertainer".

Shekhar of Oneindia Entertainment rated the film 4 out of 5, calling it "a must watch film for the fans of Pawan Kalyan and Trivikram." Jeevi of Idlebrain.com rated the film 4 out of 5 and praised Srinivas' script and added that Kalyan's performance and Srinivas' story telling skill "makes sure that your heart is touched at times and heartily laugh all the time while watching the movie". IndiaGlitz rated the film 4 out of 5 and praised Kalyan's performance in the film's climax, calling it "an unseen angle" before concluding that the film "is a treat for the family audience".

In contrast, Sridhar Vivan of Bangalore Mirror rated the film 2.5 out of 5 and criticised the film's first half and felt that the "real entertainment" began only after the entry of Brahmanandam's character. He too praised Kalyan's performance and the film's climax and Srinivas' direction. Radhika Rajamani of Rediff.com rated the film 2.5 out of 5; she praised the performances of the cast but called Attarintiki Daredi, "a stylish film which does not rise above being a routine family entertainer." IANS rated the film 2.5 out of 5 and wrote "Unfortunately, Trivikram succumbs to star pressure and churns out a highly disappointing product. At nearly three hours, the film makes you cringe in your seats, especially with the emotional punch it delivers in the climax". Sandeep Atreysa of Deccan Chronicle rated the film 1.5 out of 5 and felt that the film was made only for Kalyan's passionate fans and for others, this film would appear to be "high on style and low on content". He called Kalyan's performance as the only "silver lining".

Box office 
The film became the highest grossing Telugu film of all time surpassing Magadheera (2009). It was later surpassed by Baahubali: The Beginning (2015) as the highest grossing Telugu film of all time.

India 
Attarinitki Daredi collected  on its first day at the Andhra Pradesh and Nizam regions breaking the previous opening day record set by Baadshah. According to Adarsh, the film collected  on its first day at the Andhra Pradesh and Nizam regions. According to Adarsh, the film collected  at the Andhra Pradesh and Nizam regions.

The film earned  in its first weekend and  nett in its first week at Karnataka and also created an all-time record for a Telugu film. Adarsh reported that the Attarintiki Daredi earned  in Mumbai and Kerala. The collections dropped as result of protests in Seemandhra over the bifurcation of the state of Andhra Pradesh including in key areas like Nizam and Ceded. Adarsh reported that till 13 October 2013, the film collected  at the Andhra Pradesh and Nizam regions.

It stood in the third spot in the list of top 10 highest grossing (share) Telugu films in the Andhra Pradesh and Nizam regions preceded by Magadheera (2009) and Gabbar Singh (2012). Gabbar Singh had collected  in the Andhra Pradesh and Nizam regions in its lifetime. The film completed its 25-day run on 21 October 2013. The film crossed  in the Nizam region in its fifth weekend. The film collected  at the Andhra Pradesh and Nizam regions in 39 days.

The film collected  at the Andhra Pradesh and Nizam regions in six weeks. The film completed a 50-day run in around 170 theatres on 15 November 2013. The film completed a 100-day run in 32 theatres on 4 January 2014. On the 100th day of its theatrical run, Attarintiki Daredi was screened in four centres in Nizam, eleven in Ceded, one in Vishakhapatnam, four each in Krishna and Guntur, six and two centres in East and West Godavari respectively.

Overseas 
According to Adarsh, the film collected  from paid previews in the United States box office. The film collected more than $345,000 and grossed more than the other releases of 2013, Baadshah and Seethamma Vakitlo Sirimalle Chettu, at the United States box office. He stated that the film collected $429,000 from Thursday's preview in the United States, thereby overtaking the collections of paid previews of Chennai Express (2013) in the country. The film collected  in the first three days at United States box office. The film collected  in its first weekend at the United States box office. According to Adarsh, the film was the third biggest opener in the United States in 2013 after Chennai Express and Yeh Jawaani Hai Deewani and was the only Indian film apart from the other two to feature in the list of top 15 openers of 2013 in the country.

The film grossed over $1.5 million within three days overtaking the preview collections of Baadshah in the United States and was expected to cross the $2 million mark there.

Awards and nominations

Remakes 
The film was remade into Kannada as Ranna in 2015 directed by Nanda Kishore. It was also remade in Bengali as Abhimaan directed by Raj Chakraborty. Sundar C. directed the Tamil remake Vantha Rajavathaan Varuven which was released in 2019.

Notes

References

External links 
 

2013 films
2010s action comedy-drama films
Films shot in Tamil Nadu
Telugu films remade in other languages
Films directed by Trivikram Srinivas
Films scored by Devi Sri Prasad
Films shot in Spain
Films shot in Switzerland
Films shot in Pollachi
Films shot in Hyderabad, India
Films shot in Italy
Indian action comedy-drama films
2010s Telugu-language films
2013 masala films
Reliance Entertainment films